Trout Brook is a river in Delaware County, New York. It flows into Beaver Kill by Peakville.

References

Rivers of New York (state)
Rivers of Delaware County, New York
Tributaries of the East Branch Delaware River